The 1951 Giro d'Italia was the 34th edition of the Giro d'Italia, one of cycling's Grand Tours. The field consisted of 98 riders, and 75 riders finished the race.

By rider

By nationality

References

1951 Giro d'Italia
1951